{{Speciesbox
| image = Pilophorus perplexus lateral.jpg
| image_caption = Pilophorus perplexus| taxon = Pilophorus perplexus
| authority = Douglas & Scott, 1875
}}Pilophorus perplexus is a species of bug in the Miridae family. It can be found almost everywhere in Europe, (except for the Azores, Canary Islands, Cyprus, Iceland, Ireland, and Novaya Zemlya).

Description
The adult of the species is brown in colour. In contrast to Pilophorus cinnamopterus'', the forewings in this species are much duller. The species feed on aphids.

References

External links
Pilophorus perplexus'' on Flickr

perplexus
Insects described in 1875
Hemiptera of Europe